Juanpe is a Spanish nickname that is short for "Juan Pedro". Notable people include:

Juanpe (footballer, born 1990), Spanish football forward born Juan Pedro Berga Garzón
Juanpe (footballer, born 1991), Spanish football defender born Juan Pedro Ramírez López
Juanpe (footballer, born 1996), Spanish football midfielder born Juan Pedro Jiménez Melero